Take Ivy is a 1965 fashion photography book which documents the attire of Ivy League students from the 1960s. The New York Times described it as  "a treasure of fashion insiders". Take Ivy has been the Ivy League bible for Japanese baby boomers and has also influenced a "neo-Ivy" style in recent years.  The book has sold over fifty thousand copies worldwide. Original copies are rare in the West, garnering auction prices as high as $2,000.

Background
Take Ivy was authored by four Japanese sartorial style enthusiasts and is a collection of candid photographs shot on the campuses of America's elite Ivy League universities. The series focuses on college-aged men and their clothes between 1959 and 1965. Whether getting a meal on campus, lounging in the quad, riding bikes, studying in the library, in class, or at the boathouse, the subjects of this photographic compendium are impeccably and distinctively dressed in fine American-made garments.

Reception 
Famous American designers such as Ralph Lauren and J. Crew both display copies of "Take Ivy" in their store shelves. The style is considered a classic as magazine editors and retailers proudly display looks taken straight from the photos from the book.

Authors
Take Ivy was a photography book done by a Japanese photographer and men's style enthusiasts. The title was inspired by the jazz song "Take Five" by Dave Brubeck.

Teruyoshi Hayashida was born and raised in the fashionable Aoyama District of Tokyo. He began shooting cover images for Men's Club magazine right after the title's launch. His style is considered to be highly sophisticated and he is a connoisseur of gourmet food.

Shosuke Ishizu, the director of Ishizu Office, was born in Okayama Prefecture. He started working in the editorial division at Men's Club after graduating from Kuwasawa Design School. He established Ishizu Office in 1983, and continues to produce several clothing brands including Niblick.

Toshiyuki Kurosu joined  in 1961, where he developed merchandise and promoted sales. He left the company in 1970 and started his own business called Cross and Simon. After the brand stopped doing business, Toshiyuki began appearing as a regular guest on the hit variety show called Asayan. Toshiyuki is also an active writer and intellectual.

Hajime (Paul) Hasegawa is from Hyogo Prefecture. After finishing his studies in the U.S. in 1963, Hasegawa returned to Japan to join VAN Jacket Inc. There he was responsible for advertising and public relations. Hasegawa was the main coordinator and interpreter for the production of Take Ivy. Since then he held various managerial positions in Japan and abroad. He is currently serving as the executive director for Cosmo Public Relations Corporation.

Publishing 
Take Ivy was originally published in 1965 in Japan by Fujingahosha magazine publishers, known today as Hachette Fujuingaho, Co., Ltd. The latest edition was published by powerHouse Books in Brooklyn, NY on August 31, 2010, and retails for USD $24.95 and CAD $28.95. In 2011 a Dutch translation was written by Michael Hendriks and published by Parvenu Publishers, retailing for €19,95.

References

Further reading 
 http://www.acontinuouslean.com/2008/05/19/take-ivy/
 http://putthison.com/post/40100819929/colin-marshall-on-menswear-books-take-ivy-by
 http://thetrad.blogspot.ca/2008/12/take-ivy-chapter-i.html

Ivy League
1965 non-fiction books
Japanese fashion
American fashion
1960s fads and trends
Books of photographs